The Distrito Federal Trios Championship is a Trios (six-man) tag team Championship primarily promoted by the Mexican Lucha libre professional wrestling promotion International Wrestling Revolution Group (IWRG). The title was created in 1986 and is controlled by the "Comisión de Box y Lucha Libre Mexico D.F." (Mexico City Boxing and Wrestling Commission), which regulates all matches where the title is defended, allowing it to only be defended in Mexico City and the State of Mexico. It is considered a secondary, lower level championship than the Mexican National Trios Championship also sanctioned by the Commission but almost exclusively controlled by Consejo Mundial de Lucha Libre (CMLL). IWRG has held the control of the Distrito Federal Trios Championship since IWRG was founded in 1996 and has at times been a secondary title for the promotion, below the IWRG Intercontinental Trios Championship. The championship is not restricted by nationality, only by geographical location of where it can or cannot be defended. 

The current champions are Demonio Infernal, Eterno, and Lunatic Xtreme who became champions on February 3, 2019 by defeating Los Comandos Elite (Oficial Rayan, Oficial Spector and Oficial Liderk). The first Distrito Federal Champions was the team known as Los Temerarios ("The Reckless"; Black Terry, Jose Luis Feliciano, Shu el Guerrero) who won the championship at some point in 1986. Due to very few paper records being preserved of professional wrestling events, especially on the independent circuit there are periods of time where the status of the championship is unclear. At times there is no record of the specific date a team won the championship or who they defeated, leaving the possibility that there may have been other championship reigns in that period of time. Due to the fictional nature of professional wrestling, it is also possible that some of the championship changes that proceeded periods of uncertainty were fictional in nature, where new champions were announced but no actual match took place. In the years preceding Los Oficiales winning the championship in 2007 the title was inactive for long periods of time and was not defended on a regular basis.

Due to the gaps in records, it can only be stated that there have been at least 39 championship reigns between 34 different trios and 83 individual wrestlers. The first version of Los Oficiales (Guardia, Oficial, and Virgilante) is the trio with the most reigns as a team, three; while Oficial is the individual with the most reigns, holding the championship with three different configurations of Los Oficiales. The longest reigning Trio is the current version of Los Oficiales, whose reign from July 19, 2007, to December 7, 2008, was the longest with 507 days in total. Technically the 31st reign by Gringos VIP lasted 679 days, but during the trio's reign the Commission allowed Gringo Loco to be replaced by Apolo Estrada, Jr. as Gringo Loco had returned to the United States of America about halfway through their reign, making Los Oficiales the longest reigning trio. The current version of Los Oficiales is also the team with the longest combined, confirmed championship reign at  days and counting. Oficial AK-47 has the longest combined reign for an individual, combining four reigns to  days and counting. The Nuevo León based trio of Los Divos (Bengalí, Cats, and Raiden) held the championship for 21 days in 2005, making it the shortest confirmed reign of any champions. Four wrestlers have been champions under two different wrestling identities; Black Terry has held the title twice under that name and once as the masked character Guerrero Maya. Oficial AK-47 has held it both under his current character and as "Ultra Mega" as well, Oficial Factor previously held the championship under his former identity of Mega as well while Oficial Spartan also held the championship under the name Omega.

As it is a professional wrestling championship, the championship was not won not by actual competition, but by a scripted ending to a match determined by the bookers and match makers. On occasion the promotion declares a championship vacant, which means there is no champion at that point in time. This can either be due to a storyline, or real life issues such as a champion suffering an injury being unable to defend the championship, or leaving the company.

Championship tournaments
It is believed that the original champions Los Temerarios (Black Terry, Jose Luis Feliciano, Shu el Guerrero) won a trios tournament of indeterminate size, but no documentation of the date or participants of the tournament exists.

Distrito Federal Trios Tournament, 2010
In April 2010 IWRG stripped Los Terribles Cerebros (Black Terry, Cerebro Negro and Dr. Cerebro) of the championship due to Cerebro Negro electing to work a Desastre Total Ultraviolento (DTU) on the same day as an IWRG show, forcing IWRG to abandon the planned match. IWRG held an eight-team, one night single elimination tournament from April 15 to April 29, 2010 to crown the new champions. Cerebro Negro actually participated in the tournament, but did not team with his former partners Black Terry and Dr. Cerebro.

Title history

Combined reigns

By team

By individual

References

External links
 Distrito Federal Trios Championship

International Wrestling Revolution Group championships
Trios wrestling tag team championships
Regional professional wrestling championships